Gerard Peter Dipoto (born May 24, 1968) is an American baseball executive and former professional player. He is currently the President of Baseball Operations for the Seattle Mariners of Major League Baseball and previously worked in front office positions for the Arizona Diamondbacks, Los Angeles Angels, and Boston Red Sox. Dipoto played in MLB for the Cleveland Indians, New York Mets, and Colorado Rockies from 1993 through 2000.

Early life
Dipoto was born to Gerard & Barbara Dipoto and has two siblings, Marc Dipoto and Lori Dipoto-Dorsey. He played high school baseball at Toms River High School North in Toms River, New Jersey.  He enrolled at Virginia Commonwealth University (VCU) and played college baseball for the VCU Rams.

Professional career
The Cleveland Indians selected Dipoto in the third round of the 1989 Major League Baseball Draft. He made his major league debut in 1993.

After the 1994 season, the Indians traded Dipoto with Paul Byrd, Dave Mlicki and a player to be named later (minor leaguer Jesus Azuaje) to the New York Mets for Jeromy Burnitz and Joe Roa.

After the 1996 season, he was traded by the Mets to the Colorado Rockies for Armando Reynoso.

Front office career
Forced to retire during the spring of 2001, Dipoto went to work in the Colorado Rockies front office as a special assistant to then-general-manager Dan O'Dowd. In 2003, he became a scout for the Boston Red Sox, and in 2004 was a part of the World Series winning team as a scout. In 2005, he returned to the Rockies as the head of professional scouting. When Josh Byrnes, whom Dipoto had known since his days as a Rockies player, became the General Manager of the Arizona Diamondbacks, Dipoto went with Byrnes to Arizona and became the Director of Scouting and Player Personnel.

Byrnes was fired on July 1, 2010, and Dipoto was named interim General Manager. On September 22, Kevin Towers was named the new Diamondbacks General Manager.  Dipoto was offered the opportunity to remain with the Diamondbacks.

On October 28, 2011, the Los Angeles Angels of Anaheim announced Dipoto would be their next general manager, replacing Tony Reagins. Angels' owner Arte Moreno said that "one of the reasons we hired Jerry is that I really liked the way he viewed baseball analytics." However, Dipoto and manager Mike Scioscia disagreed regarding the use of analytics in baseball decisions, and a rift developed between the two when Dipoto fired Mickey Hatcher from the role of the team's hitting coach. Despite rumors that the Angels might replace either Dipoto or Scioscia after the 2013 season, Moreno announced that both would return to the Angels for the 2014 season.

Tension between Dipoto and Scioscia continued during the 2015 season regarding the way Scioscia and his coaches delivered statistical reports developed by Dipoto and the front office to their players. Dipoto resigned his post on July 1, 2015.

On August 12, 2015, the Boston Red Sox hired Dipoto in an advisory role. After the Seattle Mariners fired Jack Zduriencik after seven years with the club, they launched a GM search which lasted exactly one month, culminating with the hiring of Dipoto on September 28, 2015.

On September 1, 2021, the Mariners promoted Dipoto to president of baseball operations and signed him to a multi-year contract extension.

Personal life
Dipoto and his wife, Tamie, have three children: Taylor, Jordan, and Jonah. He is also a thyroid cancer survivor, having undergone curative thyroid surgery in 1994.

References

External links
, or Retrosheet

1968 births
Living people
Arizona Diamondbacks executives
Baseball players from Jersey City, New Jersey
Boston Red Sox scouts
Canton-Akron Indians players
Charlotte Knights players
Cleveland Indians players
Colorado Rockies executives
Colorado Rockies players
Colorado Springs Sky Sox players
Kinston Indians players
Leones del Caracas players
American expatriate baseball players in Venezuela
Los Angeles Angels of Anaheim executives
Major League Baseball general managers
Major League Baseball pitchers
Major League Baseball scouting directors
New York Mets players
Seattle Mariners executives
Sportspeople from Jersey City, New Jersey
Sportspeople from Toms River, New Jersey
Toms River High School North alumni
VCU Rams baseball players
Virginia Commonwealth University alumni
Watertown Indians players
Peninsula Oilers players